The American Frozen Food Institute (AFFI) is a national trade association for the frozen food industry in the USA. AFFI conducts research, lobbying, and marketing efforts to promote frozen food. The association was founded in 1942 and is headquartered in McLean, Virginia. 

Subsidiaries of the association include:
 Alliance for Listeriosis Prevention
 Frozen Food Foundation

References

Frozen food
Food industry trade groups
1942 establishments in Virginia